Chris Driedger (born May 18, 1994) is a Canadian professional ice hockey goaltender for the Coachella Valley Firebirds in the American Hockey League (AHL) while under contract to the Seattle Kraken of the National Hockey League (NHL). Driedger was selected by the Ottawa Senators in the third round (76th overall) of the 2012 NHL Entry Draft.

Early life
Driedger was born on May 18, 1994, in Winnipeg, Manitoba, to parents Cindy and Kelly.

Playing career
Growing up in Manitoba, Driedger played AAA Bantam and Midget ice hockey for the Winnipeg Monarchs organization. As a result of his Bantam and Midget play, Driedger was drafted 80th overall by the Tri-City Americans of the Western Hockey League (WHL) in 2009. He returned to the Monarchs for the 2009–10 season where he totaled a 13-6-0 record with a 2.14 goals against average and five shutouts. Driedger then began his major junior hockey career with the Americans during the 2010–11 season. While playing at the major junior level, Driedger was also enrolled at St. Paul's High School and competed in track. In his rookie season with the Americans, Driedger was named to Team West for the 2011 World U-17 Hockey Challenge after he compiled a 1-1 record along with a 3.73 goals against average and a 0.876 save percentage through four games. He finished the season amassing a 6-6-0-1 record through 22 games while also accumulating a 3.50 goals against average and a 0.881 save percentage. As such, Driedger was invited to participate in Hockey Canada's Program of Excellence Goaltending Camp.

Following the 2010–11 season, Driedger was acquired by the Calgary Hitmen in an off-season trade in exchange for a 3rd round pick in the 2012 Bantam Draft. His first season with the Hitmen began with a slow start due to a high ankle sprain and a loss in his first start. His performance continued to decline and his 2.03 goals-against average and a 4-2-0-1 record dropped to a 3-3-1-0 record and 3.79 GAA in November. As he continued to drop in December, he was encouraged to seek the help of a sports psychologist. The Hitmen eventually established a tandem goaltending system with Driedger and Brandon Glover who split the starting position throughout the season. By April, Driedger doubled the amount of games from his previous season with the American and established a 24-12-2-1 record with a 2.80 goals against average and 0.896 save percentage. Driedger's outstanding play was recognized when he was invited to compete at the 2012 CHL/NHL Top Prospects Game for Team Orr.

As the season concluded, Driedger was ranked 13th among North American goaltending prospects eligible for the 2012 NHL Entry Draft. He was eventually drafted by the Ottawa Senators in the third round, 76th overall, to make him the only WHL goaltender claimed in 2012. Prior to the draft, the Hitmen dealt Glover making Driedger the de facto starter for the 2012–13 season. As a result of this responsibility, Driedger prepared himself physically and mentally during the offseason to ready himself for the next season. Once the season began, Driedger earned a 10-3-1-1 record, a 2.37 G AA, and .920 save percentage by mid-November. The Hitmen also relied on rookie netminder Mack Shields who yielded a 3-2-0-1 record. By the end of the month, Driedger improved to a 19-6-1-2 record to lead the Hitmen to the top of the Eastern Conference. As such, he was recognized as the WHL's Goaltender of the Month for November. His play continued to improve as the season progressed and he helped the Hitmen qualify for the 2013 WHL Playoffs as their starting goaltender.

Driedger continued to play with the Calgary Hitmen though to the end of the 2013–14 season. During his final season in the WHL, on February 1, 2014, Driedger was the last member of the Calgary Hitmen to play the puck before it was inadvertently put into the empty net of the Kootenay Ice, becoming the sixth goaltender in WHL history, and the first in the Hitmen franchise history, to be credited with scoring a goal. He also became the Hitmen's all-time saves leader, surpassing Martin Jones mark of 3,374 saves. Driedger completed his major junior career with 170 regular-season WHL games played and a win-loss-tie record of 94–46–15 including eight shutouts.

Professional

Ottawa Senators and Florida Panthers
On April 1, 2014, the Ottawa Senators signed Driedger to a three-year entry-level contract. On March 26, 2015, Driedger made his NHL debut with Ottawa, entering a game against the New York Rangers.
After five seasons within the Senators organization, Driedger was released as a free agent. On July 3, 2018, he agreed to a one-year AHL contract with the Springfield Thunderbirds, the primary affiliate to the Florida Panthers. In the 2018–19 season, Driedger initially split his time between the Thunderbirds and Manchester Monarchs of the ECHL, before solidifying his role in the AHL. He made 16 appearances with Springfield before he was signed to a two-way NHL contract with the Florida Panthers for the remainder of the season on February 24, 2019. On April 30, 2019, Driedger signed a two-year contract extension with the Panthers. Towards the beginning of the 2019–20 season, on November 30, 2019, Driedger made his first career start against the Nashville Predators, in which he recorded a 27 save, 3–0 shutout win.

Seattle Kraken
On July 21, 2021, Driedger was selected from the Panthers at the 2021 NHL Expansion Draft by the Seattle Kraken. Driedger was immediately signed to a three-year, $10.5 million contract by the Kraken. In his first season with the Kraken, Driedger was often sidelined due to injury issues. His first injury came after relieving Philipp Grubauer in a loss to the Philadelphia Flyers on October 18. He missed numerous games while working out in solo sessions with goalie coach Andrew Allen before rejoining the team on November 2. However, he was reinjured later that month following a 7–4 win on November 29 and missed numerous games to recover.

In the off-season, Driedger joined Team Canada at the 2022 IIHF World Championship. He took over as starter after an injury to the team's original starter, Logan Thompson. He was himself injured midway through the final against Team Finland, where Canada ultimately won the silver medal. It was subsequently announced that Driedger had suffered a torn ACL, and that as a result he would miss 7 to 9 months of playing time into the 2022–23 season.

Career statistics

Regular season and playoffs

International

Awards and honours

References

External links 

1994 births
Living people
Binghamton Senators players
Calgary Hitmen players
Canadian ice hockey goaltenders
Coachella Valley Firebirds players
Elmira Jackals (ECHL) players
Evansville IceMen players
Florida Panthers players
Manchester Monarchs (ECHL) players
Ottawa Senators draft picks
Ottawa Senators players
Seattle Kraken players
Ice hockey people from Winnipeg
Springfield Thunderbirds players
Tri-City Americans players
Wichita Thunder players
Canadian expatriate ice hockey players in the United States